Thief Simulator is an open-world stealth video game developed by Polish video game development studio Noble Muffins and released for Microsoft Windows on November 9, 2018, for Nintendo Switch on May 16, 2019, for PlayStation 4 on August 12, 2020, and for the Meta (Oculus) Quest 2 on July 8, 2022.

Synopsis
The player assumes the role of an unnamed thief, who works for the Lombardis Mafia after they paid his bail, guided by Vinny to commit crimes. At the end of the game's original story, Vinny attempts to kill the thief with a mail bomb, but fails. In a later update, the thief transverses between the industrial district's buildings to steal evidence implicating the Lombardis and explosive constituents. He then stashes the evidence in the garage and the explosive charge in the office before setting it off. Vinny is presumably killed as the mansion explodes.

Reception

Thief Simulator received generally favorable reviews and even made it to the top of Steam's list of best-selling games on its opening weekend.

References

External links
 
 Thief Simulator at Steam

2018 video games
Video games developed in Poland
Stealth video games
Windows games
Nintendo Switch games
Xbox One games
PlayStation 4 games
Video games about crime
Organized crime video games
Simulation video games
Single-player video games
PlayWay games